Caelostomus natalensis is a species of ground beetle in the subfamily Pterostichinae. It was described by Peringuey in 1896.

References

Caelostomus
Beetles described in 1896